2,2-Dimethyl-1-butanol is an organic chemical compound; it is one of the isomeric hexanols. Its main use is as a solvent.

References 

Hexanols
Primary alcohols